The Parish of Our Lady of Acheropita (Portuguese: Paróquia Nossa Senhora Achiropita) is a church located in São Paulo, Brazil, in the Archdiocese of São Paulo. It was established on 4 March 1926 by Italian immigrants.

It is the only church in Brazil dedicated to Our Lady of Acheropita. She is remembered annually on August 15 for a month, with the Nossa Senhora Anchiropita celebration, an event part of the official calendar of São Paulo.

See also 

 Parishes in the Archdiocese of São Paulo
 Festa de Nossa Senhora Achiropita, culture of the Bixiga neighbourhood

References

External links 

 Official Website

Roman Catholic churches in São Paulo